Kaadhali may refer to:

 Kaadhali (1997 film), a Tamil-language film
 Kaadhali (2017 film), a Telugu-language film